Robert Lee Ware, Jr. (born August 20, 1952) is an American politician. Since 1998 he has served in the Virginia House of Delegates, representing the 65th district west of Richmond, consisting of the entirety of his home county of Powhatan, the precincts of Skinquarter, Tomahawk, Woolridge, Brandermill, Swift Creek, Evergreen West, Edgewater, Midlothian, Roseland, and Midlothian North in Chesterfield County; the precincts of Fife, Three Square, Sandy Hook, and Goochland Court House 2, in Goochland County; and the precincts of Columbia and Fork Union in Fluvanna County. He is a member of the Republican Party.

Life, education, career
Ware was born in Fitchburg, Massachusetts. He received a B.A. degree in history and literature from Wheaton College in 1974. He also received an M.A. in American History from Harvard University. Additionally, he has pursued graduate studies in the same subjects Asbury Seminary, Northeastern University, Longwood University, and Virginia Commonwealth University.

Ware moved to Powhatan, Virginia as editor of the weekly newspaper the Powhatan Gazette, where he worked between 1981-1984.

Starting in 1984, Ware taught history and government at Powhatan High School for 15 years. He later taught at Blessed Sacrament Huguenot Academy. In 2012 he became academic dean of Benedictine College Preparatory School until his retirement in 2014. Ware is a Roman Catholic.

Positions and appointments

Ware has served on the House committees on:
Agriculture (1998–2001)
Chesapeake and Natural Resources (2002–)
Claims (1998–1999)
Commerce and Labor (2002–)
Conservation and Natural Resources (1998–2001)
Corporations
Insurance and Banking (1998–2001)
Finance (2001–)
Militia and Police (2000–2001)
Militia
Police and Public Safety (2002–2003)
Mining and Mineral Resources (1998–2000)
Rules (2010–)

His current Committee Membership assignments include:
Finance
Agriculture Chesapeake and Natural Resource
Commerce and Labor
Rules

His current Subcommittee Membership assignments include:
Agriculture Chesapeake and Natural Resources - Subcommittee #2
Finance - Subcommittee #2
Finance - Subcommittee #3
Commerce and Labor - Subcommittee #1
Rules - Subcommittee #1

Ware also serves by appointment on several commissions, including:
Small Business
Water
Health Insurance Reform
Coal & Energy
Unemployment Compensation
Employment Retirement Security and Pension Reform

He is a member of:
Governor’s Advisory Council on Revenue Estimates
Jamestown-Yorktown Foundation Board of Trustees
joint subcommittees on Local Government Fiscal Stress and Tax Preferences

Chairman of Finance Committee 
Ware is the former Chairman of the House Finance Committee.

Opposition to Selective Ban on Sunday Hunting 
Ware has historically opposed efforts to lift Virginia's selective ban on Sunday hunting. 
  In 2014, the General Assembly passed and the Governor signed legislation to permit hunting on Sunday allowing private property owners to choose for their own property, not within 200 yards of church, and no use of hunting deer with hounds.  This victory was passed by large margin of 71 in favor and the minority at 27 against.

Electoral history
Ware served two terms on the Powhatan County Board of Supervisors, 1988–1996. He was board chairman for one year.

On December 17, 1997, state Senator Joseph B. Benedetti resigned his seat to accept Governor-elect Jim Gilmore's offer to become head of the state Department of Criminal Justice Services. 65th district Delegate John Watkins was chosen to succeed Benedetti in a special election on January 6, 1998. On January 13, the day before the Virginia General Assembly convened, Ware won a special election to replace Watkins. He was sworn in three days later.

Notes

External links
 (campaign finance)

1952 births
Living people
Republican Party members of the Virginia House of Delegates
Wheaton College (Illinois) alumni
Harvard Graduate School of Arts and Sciences alumni
People from Powhatan County, Virginia
21st-century American politicians